The Crime of Rouletabille (French: Le Crime de Rouletabille) is a 1921 mystery novel by the French writer Gaston Leroux. It is the sixth in his series of novels featuring the fictional detective Joseph Rouletabille, that began with The Mystery of the Yellow Room and The Perfume of the Lady in Black.

Synopsis
Rouletabille is falsely accused of murdering a professor and his wife.

References

Bibliography
 Fiona Kelleghan. 100 Masters of Mystery and Detective Fiction: Baynard H. Kendrick. Salem Press, 2001.

1921 French novels
French mystery novels
Novels by Gaston Leroux